Full Force and Effect (stylized as Tom Clancy Full Force and Effect, Tom Clancy: Full Force and Effect, or Tom Clancy's Full Force and Effect in the United Kingdom) is a political thriller, written by Mark Greaney and published on December 2, 2014. It is the fifteenth overall entry in the Jack Ryan series and the first such entry to be published after original author Tom Clancy’s death during the previous year, as well as Greaney's second solo contribution to the franchise.

In the novel, President Jack Ryan and The Campus must stop North Korean leader Choi Ji-hoon from developing his country's nuclear weapons program. It debuted at number three in the New York Times bestseller list.

Plot 
Supreme Leader of North Korea Choi Ji-hoon wants to develop his country's nuclear weapons program, but is being hindered by sanctions from the United States and its allies. He tasks his foreign intelligence chief, Ri Tae-jin, with fast-tracking the program in order for the country to be taken more seriously as a superpower. General Ri then arranges for mining to begin in the city of Chongju, where a large deposit of rare-earth minerals has been recently discovered; the profits produced would then be used to fund the nuclear weapons program. He acquires an investor, Mexican mining mogul Óscar Roblas de Mota, who in turn hires Duke Sharps, head of a U.S. corporate espionage and investigations firm, to oversee the mining operation.

Meanwhile, the U.S. government becomes concerned about North Korea's recent test firing of an intercontinental ballistic missile (ICBM), which had crashed into the Sea of Japan. They push for more sanctions in front of the United Nations. Recognizing the lack of intelligence assets in North Korea, Director of National Intelligence Mary Pat Foley tasks CIA non-official cover operative Adam Yao with infiltrating the Chongju mining operation under cover as a skilled worker. He eventually cultivates an asset in the form of his boss, Hwang Min-ho.

Later, a cargo ship bound for North Korea, which carried parts for the ICBM similar to the recently test fired one, was confiscated by the Navy SEALs. As a result, Choi and General Ri arrange for the assassination of U.S. President Jack Ryan, who has been an obstacle to their plan, to be done at his upcoming state visit in Mexico City; they later secure the services of an Iranian bombmaker named Adel Zarif and the Maldonado cartel.

Meanwhile, President Ryan arrives in Mexico City and is later injured in the assassination attempt on him; however, he survives. General Ri then sends a hit squad to kill Zarif in order to deny any connection to the North Koreans, but the bombmaker escapes. He then asks Roblas, who then tasks Edward Riley, one of Sharps's employees, to finish the job for him. This attracts the attention of The Campus, who have been investigating Sharps's connection to the North Koreans up to this point. They later rescue Zarif from Riley in a secluded villa owned by Roblas in Mexico, although Riley escapes and Campus operator Sam Driscoll dies.

Fearing for his life after failing to obtain the nuclear weapons and assassinate President Ryan, General Ri commits suicide, taking his family along with him. Meanwhile, Hwang reaches out to his contact in China, intending to defect. Yao is then tasked with spiriting him and his family out of North Korea via a drone with the ability to carry passengers. The drone does not fit Yao, so he has to escape on his own. He is later rescued by the Chinese, who were contacted by President Ryan.

Hwang later helps a coup backed by the Chinese in North Korea, deposing Choi from power. Meanwhile, The Campus tracks down Riley in Thailand and confront him. He tries to escape but later falls to his death.

Characters

United States government
 Jack Ryan: President of the United States
 Scott Adler: Secretary of state
 Mary Pat Foley: Director of national intelligence
 Jay Canfield: Director of the Central Intelligence Agency
 Brian Calhoun: Director of the National Clandestine Service for the Central Intelligence Agency
 Robert Burgess: Secretary of defense
 Arnold van Damm: President Ryan's chief of staff
 Horatio Styles: U.S. ambassador to Mexico
 Andrea Price-O'Day: Special agent, U.S. Secret Service
 Dale Herbers: Special agent, U.S. Secret Service
 Colonel Mike Peters: Regional director, National Geospatial-Intelligence Agency
 Annette Brawley: Imagery specialist, National Geospatial-Intelligence Agency
 Adam Yao:  CIA non-official cover operative

The Campus
 Gerry Hendley: Director of The Campus/Hendley Associates
 John Clark: Director of operations
 Domingo "Ding" Chavez: Senior operations officer
 Dominic "Dom" Caruso: Operations officer
 Sam Driscoll: Operations officer
 Jack Ryan, Jr.: Operations officer
 Gavin Biery: Director of information technology
 Adara Sherman: Director of logistics/transportation

The North Koreans
 Choi Ji-hoon: Dae Wonsu (grand marshal) and Supreme leader of the Democratic People's Republic of Korea
 Ri Tae-jin: Lieutenant general in the Korean People's Army and director of the Reconnaissance General Bureau (RGB), foreign intelligence arm of North Korea
 Hwang Min-ho: Director of Korea Natural Resources Trading Corporation, North Korean state-owned mining arm

Other characters
 Wayne "Duke" Sharps: Former FBI agent, and president of Sharps Global Intelligence Partners
 Edward Riley: Former MI6 station chief, and employee of Sharps Global Intelligence Partners
 Veronika Martel (aka Élise Legrande): Former French intelligence officer, and employee of Sharps Global Intelligence Partners
 Colin Hazelton: Former CIA case officer and employee of Sharps Global Intelligence Partners
 Dr. Helen Powers: Australian geologist
 Óscar Roblas de Mota: Mexican billionaire and president of New World Metals LLC
 Daryl Ricks: Chief (E-7), Naval Special Warfare, SEAL Team 5, Echo Platoon, NSW Group One
 Marleni Allende: Chilean legal counsel of the United Nations Security Council Sanctions Committee
 Santiago Maldonado: Leader of the Maldonado cartel
 Emilio: Maldonado cartel member
 Adel Zarif: Iranian bomb maker
 Cathy Ryan: First Lady of the United States

Reception

Commercial
Full Force and Effect debuted at number three on the Combined Print & E-Book Fiction category of the New York Times bestseller list, as well as number five on the Hardcover Fiction category of the same list, for the week of December 21, 2014. In addition, it debuted at number seven on the USA Today Best Selling Books list for the week of December 11, 2014.

Less than a year later, the paperback edition of the novel peaked at number six on the Paperback Mass-Market Fiction category of the New York Times bestseller list.

Critical
The book received generally positive reviews. Publishers Weekly praised the book as "meticulously researched and exciting" and added that "The sympathetic portrayal of many of the characters opposed to America adds depth." Kirkus Reviews praised Greaney, who "delivers a story reminiscent of the older Clancy novels by showing evidence of a deep understanding of spycraft, current events, and the natures of the people who work in the shadows, at the desk and on the front lines."

References

2014 American novels
Political thriller novels
Techno-thriller novels
American thriller novels
Ryanverse
Novels set in Vietnam
Novels set in North Korea
Novels set in Asia
Novels set in Mexico
G. P. Putnam's Sons books